The 2013 Washington State Cougars football team represented Washington State University during the 2013 NCAA Division I FBS football season. The team was coached by second-year head coach Mike Leach and played their home games at Martin Stadium in Pullman, Washington. They were members of the North Division of the Pac-12 Conference. They finished the season 6–7, 4–5 in Pac-12 play to finish in a tie for fourth place in the North Division.

Washington State became bowl eligible for the first time since the 2006 season, when they went 6–6. As the seventh-place team in the Pac-12 conference, the Cougars were selected for their first bowl game since 2003. They played the Colorado State Rams in the New Mexico Bowl on December 21, 2013, losing by the score of 48–45. The game was noted for an egregious error by head coach Mike Leach, who instead of electing to kneel down the ball three times when the Rams were out of time outs, instead ran a play which resulted in a turnover. This allowed Colorado State to tie the game and ultimately win on a last-second field goal.

Schedule

Game summaries

Auburn

1st quarter scoring: WSU – Jeremiah Laufasa 4-yard run (Andrew Furney Kick); AUB – Tre Mason 8-yard run (Ryan White run for two-point conversion)

2nd quarter scoring: WSU Bobby Ratliff 7-yard pass from Connor Halliday (Andrew Furney Kick); AUB – Tre Mason 100 yard kickoff return (Cody Parkey Kick); WSU – Jeremiah Laufasa 1-yard run (Andrew Furney Kick); AUB – Corey Grant 75-yard run (Cody Parkey Kick); AUB – Cody Parkey 47-yard field goal

3rd quarter scoring: AUB – Cody Parkey 26-yard field goal; WSU – Andrew Furney 43-yard field goal

4th quarter scoring: AUB – Cody Parkey 42-yard field goal

USC

1st quarter scoring: None

2nd quarter scoring: USC – Cody Kessler 4-yard run (Andre Heidari kick); WSU – Damante Horton 70-yard interception return (Andrew Furney kick)

3rd quarter scoring: None

4th quarter scoring: WSU – Furney 41-yard field goal

Southern Utah

1st quarter scoring: WSU – Dominique Williams 43-yard pass from Connor Halliday (Andrew Furney Kick); SUU – Colton Cook 40-yard field goal; WSU – Isiah Myers 10-yard pass from Connor Halliday (Andrew Furney Kick)	

2nd quarter scoring: SUU – Raysean Martin 3-yard run (Colton Cook Kick); WSU Dominique Williams 55-yard pass From Connor Halliday (Andrew Furney Kick); WSU – Damante Horton 72-yard interception return (Andrew Furney Kick)

3rd quarter scoring: WSU – Andrew Furney 46-yard field goal; WSU – Andrew Furney 30-yard field goal; WSU – Gabe Marks 1-yard pass from Connor Halliday (Andrew Furney Kick)

4th quarter scoring: WSU – Vince Mayle 3-yard pass from Connor Halliday (Andrew Furney Kick)

Idaho

1st quarter scoring: WSU – Gabe Marks 43-yard pass from Connor Halliday (Andrew Furney Kick)

2nd quarter scoring: WSU Dominique Williams 30-yard pass From Connor Halliday (Andrew Furney Kick); WSU – Vince Mayle 20-yard pass from Connor Halliday (Andrew Furney Kick); WSU – Gabe Marks 1-yard pass from Connor Halliday (Andrew Furney);

3rd quarter scoring: WSU – Jeremiah Laufasa 13-yard run (Andrew Furney Kick)

4th quarter scoring: WSU – Jeremiah Laufasa 3-yard run (Andrew Furney Kick)

Stanford

1st quarter scoring: STAN – Jordan Williamson 28-yard field goal; WSU – Andrew Furney 36-yard field goal; STAN – Devon Cajuste 57-yard pass from Kevin Hogan (Williamson kick)

2nd quarter scoring: STAN – Cajuste 33-yard pass from Hogan (Williamson kick)

3rd quarter scoring: STAN – Jordan Richards 30-yard interception return (Williamson kick); STAN – Michael Rector 45-yard pass from Hogan (Williamson kick); STAN – Trent Murphy 30-yard interception return (Williamson kick)

4th quarter scoring: STAN – Williamson 27-yard field goal; STAN – Remound Wright 53-yard run (Williamson kick); WSU – Gabe Marks 47-yard pass from Austin Apodaca (Furney kick); STAN – Barry Sanders 22-yard run (Conrad Ukropina kick); WSU – Rickey Galvin 8-yard pass from Apodaca (Furney kick)

This is the last time the Cougars have played a home game in CenturyLink Stadium

Cal

Cal holds a 44–25–5 record in the series and has won the last eight games.

1st quarter scoring: WSU – Vince Mayle 35-yard pass from Connor Halliday (Andrew Furney kick); WSU – Jeremiah Laufasa 5-yard run (Furney kick)

2nd quarter scoring: CAL – Deandre Coleman 2-yard safety on Teondray Caldwell; CAL – Vincenzo D'Amato 35-yard field goal; CAL – Chris Harper 89-yard pass from Jared Goff (D'Amato kick); WSU – Marcus Mason 68-yard from Halliday (Furney kick); CAL – D'Amato 43-yard field goal

3rd quarter scoring: WSU – Teondray Caldwell 10-yard run (Furney kick); WSU – Vince Mayle 72-yard pass from (Furney Kick); CAL – James Grisom 53-yard pass from Goff (D'Amato kick)

4th quarter scoring: WSU – Furney 44-yard field goal; WSU –  Furney 41-yard field goal; WSU – Furney 28 yard field goal

Oregon State

Oregon

1st quarter scoring: ORE – Marcus Mariota 54-yard run (2-point conversion attempt failed); ORE – Byron Marshall 1-yard run (Matt Wogan kick); WSU – Dom Williams 11-yard pass from Connor Halliday (Andrew Furney Kick); ORE – Marshall 26-yard run (Alejandro Maldonado kick)

2nd quarter scoring: ORE – Thomas Tyner 1-yard run (Wogan kick); WSU – River Cracraft 12-yard pass from Halliday (Furney kick); WSU – Xavier Cooper 29-yard pass from Halliday (Furney kick); ORE – Tyner 66-yard run (Maldonado kick); WSU – Furney 49-yard Field Goal

3rd quarter scoring: ORE – Keanon Low 10-yard pass from Mariota (Wogan kick); ORE – Marshall 30-yard run (Maldonado kick)

4th quarter scoring: ORE – Josh Huff 17-yard pass from Mariota (Wogan kick); ORE – Terrance Mitchell 51-yard interception return (Maldonado kick); WSU – Gabe Marks 8-yard pass from Halliday (Furney kick); WSU – Bobby Ratliff 3-yard pass from Halliday (Furney kick)

Arizona State

1st quarter scoring: ASU – Taylor Kelly 7-yard run (Zane Gonzalez kick); ASU – Kelly 6-yard run (Gonzalez kick); ASU – Jaelen Strong 11-yard pass from Kelly (Gonzalez kick)

2nd quarter scoring: WSU – Gabe Marks 34-yard pass from Connor Halliday (Andrew Furney kick); ASU – D. J. Foster 7-yard pass from Kelly (Gonzalez kick); ASU – Richard Smith 51-yard pass from Kelly (Gonzalez kick); ASU – Chris Coyle 8-yard pass from Kelly (Gonzalez kick); WSU – Rickey Galvin 15-yard pass from Halliday (Furney Kick)

3rd quarter scoring: WSU – Jeremiah Laufausa 4-yard run (Furney kick); ASU – Foster 23-yard pass from Kelly (Gonzalez kick)

4th quarter scoring: ASU – Gonzalez 37-yard field goal; ASU – Gonzalez 36-yard field goal

Arizona

1st quarter scoring: WSU – Marcus Mason 15-yard run (Andrew Furney kick); WSU – Furney 24-yard field goal; ARIZ – Ka'Deem Carey 30-yard run (Jake Smith kick)

2nd quarter scoring: ARIZ – Carey 7-yard ass from B.J. Denker (Smith kick)

3rd quarter scoring: WSU – River Cracraft 23-yard pass from Connor Halliday (Furney kick); ARIZ – Smith 25-yard field goal

4th quarter scoring: WSU – Isiah Myers 25-yard pass from Halliday (Furney kick)

Utah

1st quarter scoring: WSU – Dom Williams 5-yard pass from Connor Halliday (Andrew Furney kick); WSU – Damante Horton 22-7ard interception return (Furney kick); WSU – Casey Locker 39-yard interception return (Furney kick); UTAH – Kelvin York 14-yard run (Andy Phillips kick)

2nd quarter scoring: UTAH – York 2-yard run (Phillips kick); WSU – Furney 27-yard field goal; WSU – Marcus Mason 9-yard pass from Halliday (PAT blocked); UTAH – Dres Anderson 3-yard pass from Adam Schulz (two-point pass conversion failed); WSU – Furney 52-yard field goal

3rd quarter scoring: UTAH – Phillips 34-yard field goal; WSU – Furney 28-yard field goal; UTAH – Jake Murphy 11-yard pass from Schulz (Phillips kick); WSU – Vince Mayle 8-yard pass from Halliday (Furney kick)

4th quarter scoring: UTAH – Murphy 64-yard pass from Schulz (Phillips kick); WSU – Williams 71-yard pass from Halliday (two-point pass conversion failed)

Washington

1st quarter scoring: UW – Travis Coons 48-yard field goal

2nd quarter scoring: WSU – Andrew Furney 49-yard field goal; WSU – Rickey Galvin 14-yard pass from Connor Halliday (Furney kick)

3rd quarter scoring: UW – Austin Seferian-Jenkins 18-yard pass from Keith Price (Coons kick); UW – Bishop Sankey 7-yard run (Coons kick); UW – Coons 39-yard field goal

4th quarter scoring: WSU – Dom Williams 5-yard pass from Halliday (Furney kick); UW – Price 2-yard run (Coons kick)

Colorado State (New Mexico Bowl)

Ken Williamson was the referee from the SEC.

1st quarter scoring: WSU – River Cracraft 25-yard pass from Connor Halliday (Andrew Furney kick); WSU –
Gabe Marks 1-yard pass from Halliday (Furney kick); CSU – Charles Lovett for 63-yard pass from Garrett Grayson (Jared Roberts kick); WSU – Theron West 28-yard pass from Halliday (Furney kick); CSU – Jared Roberts 25-yard field goal

2nd quarter scoring: CSU – Roberts 19-yard field goal; WSU – Vince Mayle 28-yard pass from Halliday (Furney kick); WSU – Rickey Galvin for 3 yards (Furney kick); CSU – Kapri Bibbs 1-yard run (Roberts kick); CSU – Roberts 30-yard field goal

3rd quarter scoring: WSU – Furney 33-yard field goal; CSU – Bibbs 75-yard run (Roberts kick)

4th quarter scoring: WSU – Isiah Myers 22-yard pass from Halliday (Furney kick); CSU – Jordon Vaden 12-yard pass from Grayson (Roberts kick); CSU – Bibbs 2-yard run (Bibbs run); CSU – Roberts 41-yard field goal

Personnel

References

Washington State
Washington State Cougars football seasons
Washington State Cougars football